Al-Hudood Sports Club is an Iraqi sports club based in Falastin Street, East Districts of the Tigris River, Baghdad. It has teams in various sports including football, basketball, Jujutsu, Kickboxing, and Wrestling. The best known section of the club is the Jujutsu, Kickboxing, and Wrestling teams who play in the Arab and Asian tournaments as representatives of Iraq.

History
Al-Hudood were founded in 1976 by the Border Guards Command of the MOI, In 2008–09 season, the football team was playing in the Iraqi Premier League for first time. It was less successful during the first two seasons, and relegated to Iraq Division One at the end of the 2009–10 season. But regained promotion one year later, it played in league in 2011–12 season, and was relegated to Division One again. But two years later, the team was promoted to the Iraqi Premier League, has resumed playing in the league since the 2014–15 season until it was relegated to the Division One in the 2020–21 season.

In addition to the club's participation in the Iraqi Premier League and Iraq FA Cup, the club has a military football team playing in the Interior Ministry League. In January 2018, they beat Himayat Al-Munshaat wal-Shakhsiyat on penalties to win the Iraqi Ministry of Interior Cup.

Current squad

First-team squad

Out on loan

Current technical staff

{| class="toccolours"
!bgcolor=silver|Position
!bgcolor=silver|Name
!bgcolor=silver|Nationality
|- bgcolor=#eeeeee
|Manager:||Adel Nima||
|- 
|Assistant manager:||Ibrahim Abed Nader||
|- bgcolor=#eeeeee
|Assistant manager:||Qasim Farhan||
|- 
|Fitness coach:||Faris Jihad||
|- 
|Goalkeeping coach:||Hisham Ali||
|-bgcolor=#eeeeee
| Director of football:||Hazim Taymouz||
|- 
| Administrative director:||Muslim Karim||
|-bgcolor=#eeeeee
| Club doctor:||Firas Al-Minshedawi||
|-

Kit suppliers

Managerial history

  Adel Nima 
  Abdul Ameer Naji 
  Thair Adnan 
  Adel Nima 
  Ali Wahab 
  Adel Nima 
  Mudhafar Jabbar 
  Adel Nima 
  Mudhafar Jabbar 
  Ammar Hussien 
  Abbas Attiya 
  Adel Nima

Honours
Iraq Division One
Winners: 2021–22

References

External links
 Club page on Goalzz

Sport in Baghdad
1976 establishments in Iraq
Football clubs in Baghdad